Irène du Buisson de Longpré (circa 1720-1767), was a French noblewoman, mistress to Louis XV of France.

Life 
She was the daughter of Jacques du Buisson, seigneur de Longpré, and Irène de Séran de La Tour. In 1747, she married Charles François Filleul, an official employed in the royal stables. She was apparently at one point employed in the household of the king's daughter, Princess Adélaïde. She is described by Jean-François Marmontel in his memoirs as a woman known for her affairs.   

In around 1750, she attracted the attention of Louis XV, with whom she had an affair at about the same time as the king's affair to Marie Geneviève Radix de Sainte-Foy. The relationship was not an official one, as Madame de Pompadour remained the king's official mistress. Not long after this, Louis XV had Marie-Louise O'Murphy installed at the Parc-aux-Cerfs.

Julie Filleul (1751–1822) has been referred to as the daughter of Irène du Buisson de Longpré and the king, a paternity that was supported by the fact that the king acted as her wedding witness in her marriage to Abel-François Poisson in 1767.

Irène was also the mother of the writer Adelaide Filleul.

References 

1767 deaths
18th-century French people
Mistresses of Louis XV
French ladies-in-waiting